Olivier Chevalier (born 27 February 1990) is a Belgian former professional cyclist.

Major results

2011
 4th Ronde Pévéloise
2013
 1st Ronde van Limburg
 7th Overall Tour de Wallonie
1st  Young rider classification
2015
 6th Overall Paris–Arras Tour
2016
 3rd Circuit de Wallonie

References

External links

1990 births
Living people
Belgian male cyclists
Cyclists from Hainaut (province)
Sportspeople from Mons
21st-century Belgian people